Unwanted Soldiers is a 1999 made-for-TV documentary film that was written, directed, and narrated by Jari Osborne for the National Film Board of Canada.  It won the Canada Award at the 2000 Gemini Awards.

The film tells the story of Osborne's father and other Chinese-Canadian veterans who fought in World War II, documenting a history of discrimination against them and the Chinese-Canadian community in British Columbia. Osborne's father and his compatriots recall their training for clandestine missions behind enemy lines in Southeast Asia, as they fought for a country that had discriminated again them.

See also
Military history of Asian Americans

References

External links
Watch Unwanted Soldiers at NFB.ca

1999 television films
1999 films
1999 documentary films
Canadian documentary television films
Films about Chinese Canadians
National Film Board of Canada documentaries
Documentary films about racism in Canada
Documentary films about World War II
Documentary films about veterans
Canada Award-winning shows
Films shot in British Columbia
Anti-Chinese sentiment in Canada
1990s Canadian films